Novaya Zhizn (New Life) was a daily newspaper published by a group of Mensheviks associated with the literary magazine Letopis, including Nikolai Sukhanov, Vladimir Bazarov, Stroev, Denitsky and  A. N. Tikhonov. It was published in Petrograd from  18 April (1 May) 1917 until 16 July 1918 (with a total of 354 issues) and then in Moscow from June to July 1918, when it was closed down. The most known contributor was Maxim Gorky. The Swedish correspondent of the newspaper was Paul Olberg. Its run was interrupted in September 1917, when publication was suspended on the orders of the Russian Provisional Government.

It should not be confused with the Bolsheviks' paper Novaya Zhizn, which was published for two months in 1905.

References

External links 
"Novaya Zhizn" digital archives in "Newspapers on the web and beyond", the digital resource of the National Library of Russia
 Novaya Zhizn Archive at marxists.org

Socialist newspapers
Defunct newspapers published in Russia
Publications established in 1917
Publications disestablished in 1918
Mass media in Saint Petersburg
Newspapers published in the Russian Empire